Pseudophycis is a genus of codlings of the family Moridae found around New Zealand and Southern Australia.

Species
The currently recognized species in this genus are:
 Pseudophycis bachus (J. R. Forster, 1801) (red codling)
 Pseudophycis barbata Günther, 1863 (southern bastard codling)
 Pseudophycis breviuscula (J. Richardson, 1846) (northern bastard codling)

References

Moridae
Taxa named by Albert Günther